Entmemacornis proselytes is a species of snout moth. It was described by Harrison Gray Dyar Jr. in 1919. It is found in Guatemala.

References

Moths described in 1919
Phycitinae